John Paul Fruttero and Raven Klaasen are the defending champions, but they did not partner up together.
Fruttero partnered up with Uladzimir Ignatik but lost in the semifinals to Klaasen who played alongside Izak van der Merwe and successfully defended his title, defeating Sanchai Ratiwatana and Sonchat Ratiwatana in the final 6–3, 6–4.

Seeds

Draw

Draw

References
 Main Draw

Fergana Challenger - Doubles
2012 Doubles